Cross Roads is a 1930 British drama film directed by Reginald Fogwell and starring Percy Marmont, Anne Grey and Betty Faire. It was shot at Welwyn Studios as a quota quickie. It is a melodrama about a wife killing her unfaithful husband.

Plot summary

Cast
 Percy Marmont as Jim Wyndham 
 Anne Grey as Mary Wyndham 
 Betty Faire as The Other Woman 
 Langhorn Burton as The Lawyer 
 Wilfred Shine as The father

References

Bibliography
 Chibnall, Steve. Quota Quickies: The Birth of the British 'B' Film. British Film Institute, 2007.
 Low, Rachael. Filmmaking in 1930s Britain. George Allen & Unwin, 1985.
 Wood, Linda. British Films, 1927-1939. British Film Institute, 1986.

External links
 
 

1930 films
British drama films
1930 drama films
1930s English-language films
Films directed by Reginald Fogwell
British black-and-white films
Paramount Pictures films
Films shot at Welwyn Studios
Films set in England
Quota quickies
1930s British films